

Career 
The Honourable Robert Brooking  was a judge of the Court of Appeal of Victoria from 1995, having been appointed a judge of the Supreme Court of Victoria in 1977. He was also an acting judge of the Supreme Court of the Northern Territory for 6 months in 2000–2001.

Brooking was admitted to practice as a solicitor in 1954 and was appointed a Queen's Counsel in 1969.

Brooking retired in 2002 after serving as a judge for 25 years.

In 2003 he was made an Officer of the Order of Australia "For service to the judiciary, particularly through the Victorian Court of Appeal, to the law in the areas of tenancy, building law and arbitration, and to the community".

Publications
 (1954) 6 Res Judicate 3.
 (1954) 6 Res Judicate 17.
 (1954) 6 Res Judicate 247.
 (1954) 6 Res Judicate 395.

 (1974) 9(4) Melbourne University Law Review 795.
 (2002) 85 Australian Construction Law Newsletter 5.

References

See also
List of Judges of the Supreme Court of Victoria

Judges of the Supreme Court of Victoria
Judges of the Supreme Court of the Northern Territory
20th-century Australian judges
21st-century Australian judges
Living people
Year of birth missing (living people)
Australian King's Counsel